Marmorana scabriuscula is a species of air-breathing land snail, a terrestrial pulmonate gastropod mollusk in the family Helicidae.

Distribution
This species is endemic to northwest Sicily.

Anatomy
Species within this genus create and use love darts as part of their mating behavior.

References

External links 
 Marmorana scabriuscula at AnimalBase
 Images

Helicidae
Gastropods described in 1830